Yuankang may refer to:

Yuankang, Henan (原康), a town in Linzhou, Henan, China

Historical eras
Yuankang (元康, 65BC–61BC), an era name used by Emperor Xuan of Han
Yuankang (元康, 291–299), an era name used by Emperor Hui of Jin